Parenchymella is a type of larva of a demosponge composed of an envelope of flagellated cells surrounding an internal mass of cells. Demospongiae develops directly into solid stereoblastula. It then develops flagellae to form parenchymella.

References

Larvae
Demospongiae
Sponge biology